is a fictional character in the Street Fighter series who made her first appearance in Street Fighter III: New Generation in 1997.  Elena is an expert in capoeira, and she is the nature-loving and light-hearted daughter of an East African tribal leader who has attended schools abroad and travels the world to make friends. She has been well received for a variety of reasons, including her innovative fighting style and very smooth animation in Street Fighter III. She was noted as a very powerful character in Ultra Street Fighter IV.

Background
Elena is the young daughter of a small African tribe with a warrior culture tradition from a savannah in Kenya. Her loving father, the patriarch of the tribe, has a doctorate from a French university. Elena was raised in the vast nature of Africa and she aspires to study abroad like her father did before her. She is an extremely skilled adept of capoeira, a fighting style which mostly use one's legs to fight.

Elena is 183 cm tall and weighs 52 kg, her measurements are B83 / W58 / H88, and her birthday is on September 18. She has a tomboyish but light-hearted personality, and loves music and dance. While very energetic and golden hearted, she is also smart, sociable, and culture-adaptive. Elena is always eager to learn more about the world, which is part of the reason for her travels. She is able to hear and comprehend various rhythms as well as the voices of the wind and trees.

Appearances

Video games

Street Fighter
Elena made her debut in Street Fighter III and its subsequent expansions, Street Fighter III: 2nd Impact and Street Fighter III: 3rd Strike.  In her Street Fighter III ending, Elena ends up being transferred to a high school in Japan as an exchange student, where she has befriended a young Japanese girl named  and writes home to her parents about her experiences. Her story does not change much in 2nd Impact, although Elena has an additional role as one of Hugo's potential partners in one of his multiple endings as "Elena the Wilderness Warrior", becoming the tag team of "Beauty and the Beast". In 3rd Strike, almost a year has passed since Elena has left Japan to study medicine abroad in France during the new year. Before beginning her studies again, Elena decides to street fight once again to seek new friends. In her ending, Elena writes back to her Japanese friend after returning to France from spending her summer vacation in Japan again and invites Narumi to visit her in Africa during her winter vacation.

She returns in Ultra Street Fighter IV, the final update for Street Fighter IV. While sparring with her brother, Elena feels unsettled by the feelings she senses from the surrounding trees. Her father confirms her suspicions, claiming to have already discussed the matter with the shaman. It has been determined that "a bringer of death" once walked amongst their people. The "seeds of sadness" this individual has proceeded to sow around the world have caused the trees to respond with "strange noises," the source of her disquiet. Believing that this person is associated with the upcoming S.I.N. tournament, he then reveals that he has decided to enter her into it. Furthermore, as head of the tribe, he then commands her (amid protests from her brother) to observe the fighters and thus determine "the truth", to which she happily agrees. After the tournament, Elena tells her father that she has made many friends along the way. She reflects on her selfies with the fighters in the tournament and recalls her experience with Blanka, El Fuerte, Dudley, and even Akuma. She resolves to travel the world and become friends with people from every country. With that, she decides to head for her next trip to Japan, where she meets up with Sakura.

Other games
Elena is featured as a playable character via DLC in Street Fighter X Tekken. A few elements of Elena's story are based on her role in the Street Fighter III: Ryu Final manga, including her choice of Dudley as her partner. In her story, Elena finds herself summoned to Dudley's estate and tells him she was told by a tree in his garden that the two of them must take a journey to Antarctica. Dudley agrees to accompany her but insists that he return in time for his next bout. Along the way, the two meet Tekkens Christie Monteiro, a fellow capoeira fighter whom Elena spars with. While Dudley was less than thrilled about the journey to begin with, it turns out that Elena's cheerful demeanor helped make it a fun trip. As Pandora opens, it creates a geyser of light, reminding Elena of "flowers falling from the sky", prompting Dudley to invite her to his garden. Returning to Britain, Elena told the tree who summoned her all about the trip, and the tree seemed to be listening intently.

Elena is one of the playable Capcom-side character cards appearing in the SNK vs. Capcom: Card Fighters Clash series. She appears in a cameo in the beach stage in Super Gem Fighter Mini Mix and in the London stage in Capcom vs. SNK 2. Elena was added to the social game Street Fighter Battle Combination in 2016.

Other appearances
In Street Fighter III: Ryu Final, a manga adaptation of the game, Elena has a small but nevertheless important role as she is able to mystically communicate with Ryu via a sacred tree when he was temporarily knocked out during his battle with Dudley. After speaking with Elena, Ryu is able to develop a new technique called "The Fist of the Wind" with which he defeats Dudley. Elena appears in a larger role in the Street Fighter Legends: Ibuki comic book series by UDON Entertainment. In it, she ends up being sent to the same school as Ibuki, Makoto, Narumi, and Sarai Kurosawa. Her height and exotic appearance cause her to become popular with her classmates, and she ends up fighting alongside Ibuki and Makoto against the Geki ninja clan.

Elena figures were released by manufacturers including G-Dome, Mad Hands, Yujin, and Kotabukiya. Her cards are featured in the card game Universal Fighting System.

Design and gameplay
Street Fighter III producer Tomoshi Sadamoto recalled: "We decided the country of origin before anything else. Once we decided on Africa, we felt that a female character made for better style. A male would end up being stern, and we already had plenty of stern characters. Our image of African women was that they had long arms and legs, so we felt capoeira was a fitting fighting style for her. But we didn't have a lot of materials about it, so that was difficult. At the time we couldn't quickly look of videos on the internet, like we can do now." She was originally envisioned to use a long spear.

Elena's visual design is somewhat similar to Dhalsim's, but her fighting style is strikingly different. Elena is noted for her unique gameplay style in the series, as she only uses kicks. The fighting style of Street Fighter Vs Laura resembles a mix of Elena's and Abel's. Elena's English voice actress, Karen Dyer, cosplayed the character to promote crowdfunding campaign for her live-action series project.

Elena is one of the only characters who can heal, which she uses her Super Arts to do. In Ultra Street Fighter IV, she is the only one with both offensive and defensive Ultras, the latter of which can restore half of her health bar. According to Red Bull, Elena earned an infamy during the 2015 Capcom Pro Tour for being an overpowered character "terrorizing" the players at the game's early tournaments, as her "healing Ultra, ridiculously awkward hurtbox, and even more ridiculous range and hit box was a nightmare scenario for many." Prior to the release, TechnologyTell has predicted her to be "probably be the best character for beginners" as well.

It was confirmed in the booklet of the official Street Fighter III soundtrack that Elena was based on actress Yuki Uchida during her career as a model.

Reception

Elena has been mostly very well received by video game critics and writers. According to the Computer & Video Games reviewer of the arcade version of her first game, Elena had "the most animation frames of any 2D hand drawn character in [fighting game] history. Her animation appears to be two to three times smoother than any other character in SFIII." The magazine compared her "incredible" taunt animation to "a particularly smooth cartoon." Electronic Gaming Monthly remarked that her lack of punch attacks make her awkward to use, but she can be an effective fighter for players who get used to her unusual kicks. Ultra Street Fighter IV review by Retro Gamer stated: "We've always been big fans of Hugo and Elena, so they're our favourite additions."

On the other hand, Official Dreamcast Magazine UK had listed the "bland" and "a bit crap" Elena among in their opinion the worst aspects of Street Fighter III: 3rd Strike at the time of game's release. In 2012, ScrewAttack included her among top ten underrated Street Fighter characters.

Elena was also noted as one of the relatively few black female or African characters in video games. In her article on black game characters, game designer Brenda Brathwaite cited Elena as a character who has a stereotypical design, though fellow game designer Seth Smith noted that black players tended to gravitate to such characters. In 2012, Complex ranked her as the seventh best black character in video games, adding "though not one of the most popular characters in the franchise, Elena has a cult fanbase that adores her and so do we."

Gamasutra's Brandon Sheffield expressed a desire to see her in Super Street Fighter IV, calling her his favourite character. Similarly, GamesRadar chose Elena as one of the 12 most-wanted Street Fighter characters for Super Street Fighter IV due to "wearing almost nothing and acrobatically showing off her crotch at every opportunity" and the smoothness of her animation in Street Fighter III, adding that she was "much more than just a bikini-clad tease with impossibly fluid and graceful movements" and called her a "lot of fun to play" and "the exact polar opposite of Balrog". Planet Xbox 360 shared the sentiment, listing her as one of the characters they most wanted to see in Street Fighter IV while further adding that "Elena would bring a lot of depth to character roster that truly needs more women representation ... if guys drool over Cammy’s legs, then Elena should make them blush in the company of other women."

She has gained a popularity among the series' fandom as well. In an official poll by Namco in 2012, Elena was the 13th most requested Street Fighter character to be added to the roster of Tekken X Street Fighter. She won Gameyaro.com's vote for the most kawaii Street Fighter female. In a 2018 worldwide poll by Capcom, Elena was voted 42nd most popular Street Fighter character (out of 109).

See also
List of Street Fighter characters

Notes

References

External links 
 Official character profiles: Street Fighter IV, Street Fighter X Tekken 
 Elena's Street Fighter III entry at StrategyWiki

Black characters in video games
Dancer characters in video games
Female characters in anime and manga
Female characters in video games
Fictional capoeira practitioners
Fictional martial artists in video games
Fictional Kenyan people
Fictional physicians
Princess characters in video games
Street Fighter characters
Teenage characters in video games
Woman soldier and warrior characters in video games
Video game characters introduced in 1997
Video game characters with accelerated healing